Heike Singer (born 14 July 1964 in Rodewisch) is an East German sprint canoer who competed in the mid late 1980s. She won a gold medal in the K-4 500 m event at the 1988 Summer Olympics in Seoul.

Singer also won three gold medals at the ICF Canoe Sprint World Championships with one in the K-2 500 m (1989) and two in the K-4 500 m (1985, 1989) events.

References

External links 
 
 

1964 births
Living people
People from Rodewisch
People from Bezirk Karl-Marx-Stadt
East German female canoeists
Sportspeople from Saxony
Olympic canoeists of East Germany
Canoeists at the 1988 Summer Olympics
Olympic gold medalists for East Germany
Olympic medalists in canoeing
ICF Canoe Sprint World Championships medalists in kayak
Medalists at the 1988 Summer Olympics